John Kidley (13 February 1898 – April 1985) was an Irish boxer. He competed in the men's light heavyweight event at the 1924 Summer Olympics.

References

External links
 

1898 births
1985 deaths
Irish male boxers
Olympic boxers of Ireland
Boxers at the 1924 Summer Olympics
Place of birth missing
Light-heavyweight boxers